Roughly 400 known ogham inscriptions are on stone monuments scattered around the Irish Sea, the bulk of them dating to the fifth and sixth centuries. Their language is predominantly Primitive Irish, but a few examples record fragments of the Pictish language. Ogham itself is an Early Medieval form of alphabet or cipher, sometimes known as the "Celtic Tree Alphabet".

A number of different numbering schemes are used. The most widespread is CIIC, after R. A. S. Macalister (Corpus Inscriptionum Insularum Celticarum, Latin for "corpus of Insular Celtic inscriptions"). This covers the inscriptions known by the 1940s. Another numbering scheme is that of the Celtic Inscribed Stones Project, CISP, based on the location of the stones; for example CIIC 1 = CISP INCHA/1. Macalister's (1945) numbers run from 1 to 507, including also Latin and Runic inscriptions, with three additional added in 1949. Ziegler lists 344 Gaelic ogham inscriptions known to Macalister (Ireland and Isle of Man), and seven additional inscriptions discovered later.

The inscriptions may be divided into "orthodox" and "scholastic" specimens. "Orthodox" inscriptions date to the Primitive Irish period, and record a name of an individual, either as a cenotaph or tombstone, or documenting land ownership. "Scholastic" inscriptions date from the medieval Old Irish period up to modern times.

The vast bulk of the surviving ogham inscriptions stretch in arc from County Kerry (especially Corcu Duibne) in the south of Ireland across to Dyfed in south Wales. The remainder are mostly in south-eastern Ireland, eastern and northern Scotland, the Isle of Man, and England around the Devon/Cornwall border. The vast majority of the inscriptions consists of personal names, probably of the person commemorated by the monument.

Orthodox inscriptions

In orthodox inscriptions, the script was carved into the edge (droim or faobhar) of the stone, which formed the stemline against which individual characters are cut. The text of these "Orthodox Ogham" inscriptions is read beginning from the bottom left side of a stone, continuing upward along the edge, across the top and down the right side (in the case of long inscriptions).

MacManus (1991) lists a total of 382 known Orthodox inscriptions. They are found in most counties of Ireland but are concentrated in southern Ireland, with the highest numbers found in County Kerry (130), Cork (84), and Waterford (48). Other counts are as follows: Kilkenny (14); Mayo (9); Kildare (8); Wicklow and Meath (5 each); Carlow (4); Wexford, Limerick, and Roscommon (3 each); Antrim, Cavan, Louth, and Tipperary (2 each);  Armagh, Dublin, Fermanagh, Leitrim, Londonderry and Tyrone (1 each). 

Other specimens are known from Wales (ca. 40: Pembrokeshire (16);  Breconshire and Carmarthenshire (7 each);  Glamorgan (4); Cardiganshire (3); Denbighshire (2); Powys (1), and Caernarvonshire (1)). A few are known of from sites in the Isle of Man (5), in England, such as Cornwall (5), Devon (2), and some doubtful examples from Scotland (possibly 2).

Formula words
The vast majority of inscriptions consists of personal names and  use a series of formula words, usually describing the person's ancestry or tribal affiliation. 

Formula words used include the following: 
MAQI  – 'son' (Modern Irish mac)
MUCOI  – 'tribe' or 'sept'
ANM  – 'name' (Modern Irish ainm)
AVI  – 'descendant' (Modern Irish uí)
CELI  – 'follower' or 'devotee' (Modern Irish céile)
NETA  – 'nephew' (Modern Irish nia)
KOI  – 'here is' (equivalent to Latin HIC IACIT). KOI is unusual in that the K is always written using the first supplementary letter Ebad. 

In order of frequency, the formula words are used as follows:
 X MAQI Y               (X son of Y)
 X MAQI MUCOI Y         (X son of the tribe Y)
 X MAQI Y MUCOI Z       (X son of Y of the tribe Z)
 X KOI MAQI MUCOI Y     (here is X son of the tribe Y)
 X MUCOI Y               (X of the tribe Y)
 X MAQI Y MAQI MUCOI Z (X son of Y son of the tribe Z)
 Single name inscriptions with no accompanying formula word
 ANM X MAQI Y           (Name X son of Y)
 ANM X                   (Name X )
 X AVI Y                 (X descendant of Y)
 X MAQI Y AVI Z         (X son of Y descendant of Z)
 X CELI Y                (X follower/devotee of Y)
 NETTA X                 (nephew/champion of X)

Nomenclature
The nomenclature of the Irish personal names is more interesting than the rather repetitive formulae and reveals details of early Gaelic society, particularly its warlike nature. 

For example, two of the most commonly occurring elements in the names are CUNA  – 'hound' or 'wolf' (Modern Irish cú) and CATTU  – 'battle' (Modern Irish cath).

These occur in names such as (300) CUNANETAS  – 'Champion of wolves'; (501) CUNAMAGLI  – 'prince of wolves'; (107) CUNAGUSSOS  – '(he who is) strong as a wolf'; (250) CATTUVVIRR  – 'man of battle'; (303) CATABAR  – 'chief in battle'; IVACATTOS  – 'yew of battle'. 

Other warlike names include (39) BRANOGENI  – 'born of raven'; (428) TRENAGUSU  – 'strong of vigour'; and (504) BIVAIDONAS  – 'alive like fire'.

Elements that are descriptive of physical characteristics are also common, such as (368) VENDUBARI  – 'fair-headed'; (75) CASONI  – 'curly headed one'; (119) DALAGNI  – 'one who is blind'; (46) DERCMASOC  – 'one with an elegant eye'; (60) MAILAGNI  – 'bald/short haired one' and (239) GATTAGLAN  – 'wise and pure'.

Other names indicate a divine ancestor. The god Lugh features in many names such as (4) LUGADDON , (286) LUGUDECA  and (140) LUGAVVECCA , while the divine name ERC (meaning either 'heaven or 'cow') appears in names such as (93) ERCAIDANA  and (196) ERCAVICCAS . 

Other names indicate sept or tribal name, such as (156) DOVVINIAS  from the Corcu Duibne sept of the Dingle and Iveragh peninsulas in Co. Kerry (named after a local goddess); (215) ALLATO  from the Altraige of North Kerry and (106) CORIBIRI  from the Dál Coirpri of Co. Cork. 

The content of the inscriptions has led scholars such as McNeill and Macalister to argue that they are explicitly pagan in nature. They argue that the inscriptions were later defaced by Christian converts, who deliberately  removed the word MUCOI  on account of its supposedly pagan associations and added crosses next to them. 

Other scholars, such as McManus, argue that there is no evidence for this, citing inscriptions such as (145) QRIMITIR RONANN MAQ COMOGANN , where QRIMITIR is a loan word from Latin presbyter or 'priest'. McManus argues that the supposed vandalism of the inscriptions is simply wear and tear, and due to the inscription stones being reused as building material for walls, lintels, etc. (McManus, §4.9). McManus also argues that the MUCOI formula word survived into Christian manuscript usage. There is also the fact the inscriptions were made at a time when Christianity had become firmly established in Ireland. Whether those who wrote the inscriptions were pagans, Christians, or a mixture of both remains unclear.

Ireland
Ireland has the vast majority of inscriptions, with 330 out of 382. One of the most important collections of orthodox ogham inscriptions in Ireland can be seen in University College Cork (UCC) on public display in 'The Stone Corridor'. The inscriptions were 
collected by antiquarian Abraham Abell 1783–1851 and were deposited in the Cork Institution before being put on display in UCC. He was a member of the Cuvierian Society of Cork whose members, including John Windele, Fr. Matt Horgan and R.R. Brash, did extensive work in this area in the mid-19th century. 

Another well-known group of inscriptions, known as the  Dunloe Ogham Stones, can be seen at Dunloe near Killarney in Co. Kerry. The inscriptions are arranged in a semicircle at the side of the road and are very well preserved.

Wales

The orthodox inscriptions in Wales are noted for containing names of both Latin and Brythonic (or early Welsh) origin, and are mostly accompanied by a Latin inscription in the Roman alphabet (Ecclesiastical and Late Latin remained the language of writing in Wales throughout the post-Roman period). Examples of Brythonic names include (446) MAGLOCUNI  (Welsh Maelgwn) and (449) CUNOTAMI  (Welsh cyndaf).  

Wales has the distinction of the only ogham stone inscription that bears the name of an identifiable individual. The stone commemorates Vortiporius, a 6th-century king of Dyfed (originally located in Clynderwen). Wales also has the only ogham inscription known to commemorate a woman. At Eglwys Cymmin (Cymmin church) in Carmarthenshire is the inscription (362) AVITORIGES INIGENA CUNIGNI  or 'Avitoriges daughter of Cunigni'. Avitoriges is an Irish name while Cunigni is Brythonic (Welsh Cynin), reflecting the mixed heritage of the inscription makers. Wales also has several inscriptions which attempt to replicate the supplementary letter or forfeda for P (inscriptions 327 and 409).

England, Isle of Man, Scotland

England has seven or eight ogham inscriptions, five in Cornwall and two in Devon, which are the product of early Irish settlement in the area (then the Brythonic kingdom of Dumnonia). A further inscription in Silchester in Hampshire is presumed to be the work of a lone Irish settler. 

Scotland has only three orthodox inscriptions, as the rest are scholastic inscriptions made by the Picts (see below). 

The Isle of Man has five inscriptions. One of these is the famous inscription at Port St. Mary (503) which reads DOVAIDONA MAQI DROATA  or 'Dovaidona son of the Druid'.

Scholastic inscriptions

The term 'scholastic' derives from the fact that the inscriptions are believed to have been inspired by the manuscript sources, instead of being continuations of the original monument tradition. Scholastic inscriptions typically draw a line into the stone's surface along which the letters are arranged, rather than using the stone's edge. They begin in the course of the 6th century, and continue into Old and Middle Irish, and even into Modern times. From the High Middle Ages, contemporary to the Manuscript tradition, they may contain Forfeda. The 30 or so Pictish inscriptions qualify as early Scholastic, roughly 6th to 9th century. Some Viking Age stones on Man and Shetland are in Old Norse, or at least contain Norse names.

Scotland

Isle of Man

CISP KMICH/1, an 11th-century combined Runic and Ogam inscription in Kirk Michael churchyard, Kirk Michael, Isle of Man

Transcription:
blfsnhdtcqmgngzraouei
MUUCOMAL LAFIUA MULLGUC
MAL : LUMKUN : RAISTI : KRUS : ÞINA : IFTIR : MAL : MURU : FUSTRA : SINI : TOTIRTUFKALS : KONA : IS : AÞISL : ATI+[B]ITRA : IS : LAIFA : FUSTRA : KUÞAN : ÞAN : SON : ILAN +
Translation:
An ogham abecedarium (the whole ogham alphabet)
"Mucomael grandson/descendant of O'Maelguc"
"Mal Lumkun set up this cross in memory of Mal Mury her foster-son, daughter of Dufgal, the wife whom Athisl married,"
"Better it is to leave a good foster son than a bad son"
(The runic part is in Norse.)
 or possibly 
 ...BAC......OCOICATIALL possibly 'A thong (group) of fifty warriors'
An ogham inscription in Old Irish discovered at the Speke Farm keeill (chapel) by the seventh fairway of the Mount Murray golf course five miles southwest of Douglas by a Time Team excavation.
 Has been defined as an 11th - 12th century inscription on stylistic grounds (use of bind ogham)
However there has been at least one proposed date of 6th - 8th century from the association of a 6-7th century grave nearby, with the possibility of the more familiar variant reading '..A...MACI MUCOI CATIALL[I]' '..., son of the tribe of Catiall[i].'

Ireland
 A 19th-century ogham inscription from Ahenny, Co. Tipperary (Raftery 1969)
Beneath this sepulchral tomb lie the remains of Mary Dempsey who departed this life January the 4th 1802 aged 17 years
  
fa an lig so na lu ata mari ni dhimusa /  o mballi na gcranibh
"Beneath this stone lieth Mári Ní Dhíomasaigh from Ballycranna"

Manuscript tradition
Latin text written in ogham, in the Annals of Inisfallen of 1193 (ms. Rawlinson B. 503, 40c)

nummus honoratur sine / nummo nullus amatur
This is a hexameter line with internal rhyme at the caesura, to be scanned as follows: nūmmus honōrātur || sine nūmmō nullus amātur.
"Money is honoured, without money nobody is loved"
Fictional inscription: a Middle Irish saga text recorded in the Book of Leinster (LL 66 AB) mentions the following ogham inscription:

Gip e tised in faidche, dia m-ba gascedach, geis fair ar thecht dind faidchi cen chomrac n-oenfhir do fhuacra.
"Whoever comes to this meadow, if he be armed, he is forbidden to leave the meadow, without requesting single combat."

Literature
Brash, R. R., The Ogam Inscribed Monuments of the Gaedhil in the British Isles, London (1879).
J. Higgitt, K. Forsyth, D. Parsons (eds.), Roman, Runes and Ogham. Medieval Inscriptions in the Insular World and on the Continent, Donington: Shaun Tyas (2001).
Jackson, K.H., Notes on the Ogam inscriptions of southern Britain, in C. Fox, B. Dickins (eds.) The Early Cultures of North-West Europe. Cambridge: 197—213  (1950).
Macalister, Robert A.S. The Secret Languages of Ireland, pp27 – 36, Cambridge University Press, 1937
Macalister, R. A. S.,  Corpus Inscriptionum Insularum Celticarum Vol. I., Dublin: Stationery Office (1945).
Macalister, R. A. S., Corpus Inscriptionum Insularum Celticarum''' Vol. II., Dublin: Stationery Office (1949).
McManus, D, A Guide to Ogam, An Sagart, Maynooth, Co. Kildare (1991)
MacNeill, Eoin. Archaisms in the Ogham Inscriptions, 'Proceedings of the Royal Irish Academy' 39, pp 33–53, Dublin
Ziegler, S., Die Sprache der altirischen Ogam-Inschriften'', Göttingen: Vandenhoeck and Ruprecht (1994).

References

External links
Celtic Inscribed Stones Project (CISP)
TITUS Ogamica
Irish Ogham stones
Pictish Ogham Inscriptions
Silchester Roman Town – The Insula IX Town Life Project – The Ogham Stone

5th-century inscriptions
6th-century inscriptions
 
Irish inscriptions
Stones
Alphabets